Moderatus of Gades was a Greek philosopher of the Neopythagorean school, who lived in the 1st century AD. He was a contemporary of Apollonius of Tyana. He wrote a great work on the doctrines of the Pythagoreans, and tried to show that the successors of Pythagoras had made no additions to the views of their founder, but had merely borrowed and altered the phraseology. 

Moderatus has been given an exaggerated importance by some commentators, who have regarded him as the forerunner of the Alexandrian School of philosophy. Eduard Zeller argued that the authority on which this view is based is unsound. Moderatus is therefore a relatively unimportant though interesting representative of a type of thought which had almost disappeared since the 5th century BC.

Stobaeus, in his Eclogae, preserves a fragment of his writings; further extracts survive in the form of quotations in Porphyry's Life of Pythagoras and Simplicius's commentary on Aristotle's Physics.

References

1st-century philosophers
Neo-Pythagoreans
Ancient Roman philosophers
Year of birth missing
Year of death missing
People from Cádiz